Karkhaneh-ye Qand (also Romanized as Kārkhāneh-ye Qand) is a village in Takht-e Jolgeh Rural District, in the Central District of Firuzeh County, Razavi Khorasan Province, Iran. At the 2006 census, its population was 36, in 7 families.

References 

Populated places in Firuzeh County